Inken-Isabell Becher (formerly Beeken; born 2 September 1978) is a former German football defender.

Club career
Becher started playing football in 1985 at Berliner SV 1892, then joined Hertha 03 Zehlendorf, SC Siemensstadt and Tennis Borussia Berlin from where she switched to 1. FFC Turbine Potsdam in 2003. With TeBe she had played Bundesliga already but also experienced relegation.
With Turbine she became German champion twice, cup winner three times and won the UEFA Women's Cup in 2005. She was suspended for the second leg of the final after receiving a yellow card in the first leg.

In 2007, Becher returned to Tennis Borussia Berlin where she ended her career for health reasons after the 2007–08 season. She then again played for TeBe in the 2011–2012 Regionalliga season, but ended her career in 2016.

International career
On 28 May 1997, Becher made her Germany women's national football team debut against Norway in a 3–0 defeat. She won 13 caps, the last in Germany's 3–1 win over Canada in Vancouver on 1 September 2005.

References

External links
DFB profile

1978 births
Living people
1. FFC Turbine Potsdam players
German women's footballers
Germany women's international footballers
Footballers from Berlin
UEFA Women's Championship-winning players
Women's association football midfielders